Sarah Clarke (born February 16, 1972) is an American actress, best known for her role as Nina Myers on 24, and also for her roles as Renée Dwyer, Bella Swan's mother, in the 2008 film Twilight, Erin McGuire on the short-lived TV show Trust Me, and CIA Officer Lena Smith on the USA Network show Covert Affairs. She recently starred as Eleanor Wish in Amazon Studios' police procedural drama Bosch.

Early life
Clarke was born in St. Louis, Missouri, the daughter of Ernest Clarke, an engineer, and Carolyn, a homemaker.

She attended John Burroughs School in St. Louis, Missouri (along with Mad Men star Jon Hamm, her prom date), and Indiana University Bloomington studying Fine Arts and Italian. She dated fellow actor Paul Rudd for a short time. While a student at Indiana University, Clarke became a member of the Kappa Alpha Theta sorority. She was initiated into the Beta chapter in 1990.

Clarke became interested in acting while studying abroad during her senior year in Bologna, Italy. Upon returning to the United States, she began studying architectural photography.  She received free acting lessons in return for taking photographs of a cultural arts center, and she studied acting at Circle in the Square Theatre School, Axis Theater Company, and The Willow Cabin Theatre Company.

Career
Clarke began her acting career with an appearance in a 1999 award-winning commercial for Volkswagen.  She followed this with a role in the 2000 short film Pas de deux and received an Outstanding Performance award at the Brooklyn Film Festival. Clarke's career soon blossomed with minor roles, including films All About George in 2000 and The Accident in 2001, as well as television shows such as Ed and Sex and the City.

In 2001, Clarke auditioned for the role of CTU agent Nina Myers on 24. She won the role on the day that filming began. The wardrobe department did not have time to fit her, so she had to wear her own outfit for the entire season of filming. In her three seasons with the show, Clarke was featured in a total of 36 episodes. Clarke won a Golden Satellite Award for Best Performance by an Actress in a Supporting Role in a Drama Series for this role. Clarke also lent her voice to 24: The Game, as her 24 character, Nina Myers.

She has guest-starred on House and Life. She played Renée Dwyer, Bella Swan's mother, in Twilight. She accepted a leading role on the TNT series Trust Me, opposite Eric McCormack and Thomas Cavanagh. The series premiered on January 26, 2009 to positive reviews, though it was cancelled after one season due to declining ratings. In 2010, Clarke reprised her role as Renée Dwyer in Eclipse, the third movie in the Twilight series. In 2013, she was cast as Marla Jameson in the US version of The Tomorrow People.

Personal life
Clarke met her husband, Xander Berkeley, while on the set of 24 (he played her supervisor, George Mason) and they were married in September 2002, a year after meeting. They have two daughters: Olwyn Harper (born in 2006) and Rowan (born in 2010).

Filmography

Film

Television

Video games

References

External links

  at www.reviewgraveyard.com

1972 births
Living people
American film actresses
American television actresses
Circle in the Square Theatre School alumni
Actresses from St. Louis
20th-century American actresses
21st-century American actresses